King Wucheng of Yan (died 258 BC), ancestral name Jī (姬), clan name Yān (燕), personal name unknown, was the sixth king of the state of Yan in Warring States period of Chinese history. He ruled the kingdom between 271 BC until his death in 258 BC.

In 272 BC, King Wucheng's father, King Hui of Yan, was murdered by the powerful chancellor Lord Cheng'an (成安君). King Wucheng was crowned as the new king. In the same year, Yan was attacked by a joint expedition of Han, Wei and Chu state forces. In 265 BC, Yan lost a battle against the troops of Qi under Tian Dan. King Wucheng died in 258 BC, and was succeeded by his son King Xiao.

References

Monarchs of Yan (state)
258 BC deaths
Chinese kings
Year of birth unknown
3rd-century BC Chinese monarchs